Sogol Khaligh (Persian: سوگل خلیق; born November 7, 1988) is an Iranian actress. She is best known for her acting in The Accomplice (2020) for which she earned a Hafez Award nomination.

Early life 
She's a graduate of the Faculty of Cinema and Theater of Tehran University of Art in Theatrical Directing.

Filmography

Film

Web

Television

Theatre

Awards and nominations

References

External links

 
 
 Jam Jam newspaper website

Iranian stage actresses
1988 births
Iranian film actresses
Iranian television actresses
21st-century Iranian actresses
Living people
Tehran University of Art alumni